Yaroslav Vyacheslavovich Kharitonskiy (born 12 March 1985) is a former Russian professional footballer.

Club career
He made his professional debut in the Russian Second Division in 2001 for FC Neftyanik Yaroslavl. He played 1 game and scored 1 goal in the UEFA Intertoto Cup 2004 for FC Shinnik Yaroslavl.

He is probably best known for receiving a serious injury (double leg fracture) from a tackle by Emanuel Pogatetz, which led to 8-week disqualification for Pogatetz.

References

1985 births
Footballers from Yaroslavl
Living people
Russian footballers
Association football defenders
Russian Premier League players
FC Shinnik Yaroslavl players
FC Volga Nizhny Novgorod players
FC SKA-Khabarovsk players
FC Saturn Ramenskoye players